Tanaoctena is a genus of moths of the family Galacticidae.

Species
Tanaoctena dubia - Philpott, 1931 
Tanaoctena indubitata - Clarke, 1971 
Tanaoctena ooptila - Turner, 1913 
Tanaoctena pygmaeodes - (Turner, 1926)

Former species
Tanaoctena collina - Turner, 1926

References

Galacticidae